Stanetinci is a settlement in the Municipality of Cerkvenjak in northeastern Slovenia. It lies in the Slovene Hills south of Cerkvenjak. The area is part of the traditional region of Styria and is now included in the Drava Statistical Region.

A small Neo-Gothic chapel-shrine in the settlement was built in the last quarter of the 19th century.

References

External links
Stanetinci on Geopedia

Populated places in the Municipality of Cerkvenjak